Eastern Capital may refer to:
Tokyo
Tonkin
The former name of Luoyang
The former name of Kaifeng
The former name of  Hanoi

See also
東京 (disambiguation), Eastern Capital in Chinese
Tokyo (disambiguation)
Tokio (disambiguation)
Tonkin (disambiguation)
Dongjing (disambiguation)